Honawad  is a village in the southern state of Karnataka, India. It is located in the Tikota taluk of Vijayapura district in Karnataka.

Demographics
 India census, Honawad had a population of 7921 with 4049 males and 3872 females.

See also
 Districts of Karnataka

References

External links
 http://Bijapur.nic.in/

Villages in Bijapur district, Karnataka